A statute of limitations, known in civil law systems as a prescriptive period, is a law passed by a legislative body to set the maximum time after an event within which legal proceedings may be initiated. In most jurisdictions, such periods exist for both criminal law and civil law such as contract law and property law, though often under different names and with varying details.

When the time which is specified in a statute of limitations runs out, a claim might no longer be filed or, if it is filed, it may be subject to dismissal if the defense against that claim is raised that the claim is time-barred as having been filed after the statutory limitations period.

When a statute of limitations expires in a criminal case, the courts no longer have jurisdiction. Most common crimes that have statutes of limitations are distinguished from particularly serious crimes because the latter claims may be brought at any time.

In civil law systems, such provisions are typically part of their civil and criminal codes. The cause of action dictates the statute of limitations, which can be reduced or extended in order to ensure a full and fair trial. The intention of these laws is to facilitate resolution within a "reasonable" period of time. What amount of time is considered "reasonable" varies from country to country. In the United States, it may vary from jurisdiction to jurisdiction and state to state. Internationally, the statute of limitations may vary from one civil or criminal action to another. Some countries have no statute of limitations whatsoever.

Analysis of a statute of limitations also requires the examination of any associated statute of repose, tolling provisions, and exclusions.

Applications
Common law legal systems can include a statute specifying the length of time within which a claimant or prosecutor must file a case. In some civil jurisdictions (e.g., California), a case cannot begin after the period specified, and courts have no jurisdiction over cases filed after the statute of limitations has expired. In some other jurisdictions (e.g., New South Wales, Australia), a claim can be filed which may prove to have been brought outside the limitations period, but the court will retain jurisdiction in order to determine that issue, and the onus is on the defendant to plead it as part of their defence, or else the claim will not be statute barred.

Once they are filed, cases do not need to be resolved within the period specified in the statute of limitations.

Purpose
The purpose and effect of statutes of limitations are to protect defendants. There are three reasons for their enactment:
 A plaintiff with a valid cause of action should pursue it with reasonable diligence.
 By the time a stale claim is litigated, a defendant might have lost evidence necessary to disprove the claim.
 Litigation of a long-dormant claim may result in more cruelty than justice.

In Classical Athens, a five-year statute of limitations was established for almost all cases, exceptions being such as the prosecution of non-constitutional laws (which had no limitation). Demosthenes wrote that these statutes of limitations were adopted to control "sycophants" (professional accusers).

The limitation period generally begins when the plaintiff's cause of action accrues, meaning the date upon which the plaintiff is first able to maintain the cause of action in court, or when the plaintiff first becomes aware of a previous injury (for example, occupational lung diseases such as asbestosis).

Statute of repose

A statute of repose limits the time within which an action may be brought based upon when a particular event occurred (such as the completion of construction of a building or the date of purchase of manufactured goods), and does not permit extensions. A statute of limitations is similar to a statute of repose, but may be extended for a variety of reasons (such as the minority of the victim).

For example, most U.S. jurisdictions have passed statutes of repose for construction defects. If a person receives an electric shock due to a wiring defect that resulted from the builder's negligence during construction of a building, the builder is potentially liable for damages if the suit is brought within the time period defined by the statute, normally starting with the date that construction is substantially completed. After the statutory time period has passed, without regard to the nature or degree of the builder's negligence or misconduct, the statute of repose presents an absolute defense to the claim.

Statutes of repose are sometimes controversial; manufacturers contend that they are necessary to avoid unfair litigation and encourage consumers to maintain their property. Alternatively, consumer advocates argue that they reduce incentives to manufacture durable products and disproportionately affect the poor, because manufacturers will have less incentive to ensure low-cost or "bargain" products are manufactured to exacting safety standards.

Tolling and the discovery rule

Many jurisdictions toll or suspend the limitation period in exceptional circumstances such as if the aggrieved person (plaintiff, appellant or petitioner) was a minor, or has filed a bankruptcy proceeding. In those instances, the running of limitations is tolled or paused, until the condition ends. Equitable tolling may also be applied if an individual may intimidate a moving party into not reporting or has been promised a suspended period.

The statute of limitations may begin when the harmful event, such as fraud or injury, occurs or it may begin when the harmful event is discovered. The U.S. Supreme Court has described the "standard rule" of when the time begins as "when the plaintiff has a complete and present cause of action." The rule has existed since the 1830s. A "discovery rule" applies in other cases (including medical malpractice), or a similar effect may be applied by tolling.

According to U.S. district judge Sean J. McLaughlin, the discovery rule does not apply to mass media such as newspapers and the Internet; the statute of limitations begins to run at the date of publication. In 2013, the U.S. Supreme Court unanimously ruled in Gabelli v. SEC that the discovery rule does not apply to U.S. Securities and Exchange Commission's investment-advisor-fraud lawsuits since one of the purposes of the agency is to root out fraud.

In private civil matters, the limitation period may generally be shortened or lengthened by agreement of the parties. Under the Uniform Commercial Code, the parties to a contract for sale of goods may reduce the limitation period to one year but not extend it.

Limitation periods that are known as laches may apply in situations of equity; a judge will not issue an injunction if the requesting party waited too long to ask for it. Such periods are subject to broad judicial discretion.

For US military cases, the Uniform Code of Military Justice (UCMJ) states that all charges except those facing court-martial on a capital charge have a five-year statute of limitations. If the charges are dropped in all UCMJ proceedings except those headed for general court-martial, they may be reinstated for six months after which the statute of limitations has run out.

Prescription

In civil law countries, almost all lawsuits must be brought within a legally-determined period at the end of which the right of action is extinguished. This is known as liberative or extinctive prescription. Under Italian and Romanian law, criminal trials must be ended within a time limit.

In criminal cases, the public prosecutor must lay charges within a time limit which varies by jurisdiction and varies based on the nature of the charge, whose directives vary from country to country. Over the last decade of the 20th century, many United States jurisdictions significantly lengthened the statute of limitations for sex offenses, particularly against children, as a response to research and popular belief that a variety of causes can delay the recognition and reporting of crimes of this nature.

Common triggers for suspending the prescription include a defendant's fugitive status or the commission of a new crime. In some jurisdictions, a criminal may be convicted in absentia. Prescription should not be confused with the need to prosecute within "a reasonable delay" as obligated by the European Court of Human Rights.

Laws by region

International crimes
Under international law, genocide, crimes against humanity and war crimes are usually not subject to the statute of limitations as codified in a number of multilateral treaties. States ratifying the Convention on the Non-Applicability of Statutory Limitations to War Crimes and Crimes Against Humanity agree to disallow limitations claims for these crimes. In Article 29 of the Rome Statute of the International Criminal Court, genocide, crimes against humanity and war crimes "shall not be subject to any statute of limitations".

Australia
In Australia, there are no statutes of limitation in criminal proceedings if the maximum penalty that can be imposed for an offence committed by an individual includes imprisonment for more than 6 months. For civil matters, the statutes of limitation are prescribed by each state or territory jurisdiction.

Victoria
The Limitations Act of 1958 allows 12 years for victims of child abuse to make a claim, with age 37 the latest at which a claim can be made. The police submitted evidence  to a commission, the Victorian Inquiry into Church and Institutional Child Abuse (in existence since 2012) indicating that it takes an average of 24 years for a victims of child sexual abuse to go to the police. According to Attorney General Robert Clark, the government will remove statutes of limitations on criminal child abuse; victims of violent crime should be given additional time, as adults, to deal with the legal system. Offenders of minors and the disabled have used the statute of limitations to avoid detection and prosecution, moving from state to state and country to country; an example which was presented to the Victorian Inquiry was the Christian Brothers.

An argument for abolishing statutes of limitations for civil claims by minors and people under guardianship is ensuring that abuse of vulnerable people would be acknowledged by lawyers, police, organisations and governments, with enforceable penalties for organisations which have turned a blind eye in the past. Support groups such as SNAP Australia, Care Leavers Australia Network and Broken Rites have submitted evidence to the Victoria inquiry, and the Law Institute of Victoria has advocated changes to the statute of limitations.

Western Australia
The Criminal Procedure Act 2004 outlines the statute of limitations, stating that a simple offence (an offence which can only be brought to a magistrate's court, and cannot include more than 12 months' imprisonment as the maximum penalty) shall have a statute of limitations of 12 months. However, all crimes (offences which can be brought to a district court or the supreme court) have no statute of limitations. Furthermore, a person may be charged with a simple offence after 12 months' if the person consents to such a charge being laid, or if that offence has a different statute of limitations as provided by law.

Canada
Summary conviction offences have a limitation period of 12 months.

Indictable (serious) offences such as fraud, serious theft, murder, kidnapping, aggravated assault, sexual assault, arson, bribery, perjury, do not have a limitation period. A defendant can be charged at any future date. In sexual abuse cases in particular, men and women have been charged and convicted up to five decades after the abuse had been committed.

Civil law limitations vary by province. In Ontario, this is governed by the Limitations Act, 2002.

Finland
In Finland, the authority of a prosecuting official to bring charges for a crime expires after a set period of time has passed since the act. This period is 20, 10, 5, or 2, years depending on the seriousness of the offence. Offences punishable with life imprisonment, such as murder and treason, do not expire. Sexual offences committed against minors do not expire before the victim reaches 23 or 28 years of age, depending on the nature of the offence.

Germany
In Germany, the statute of limitations on crimes varies by type of crime, with the highest statute of limitation being 30 years for voluntary manslaughter.  Murder, genocide, crimes against humanity, war crimes and the crime of aggression have no statute of limitations.

In Germany, the crime of murder used to have a 20 year statute of limitations. In 1969, the statute of limitations for murder was extended from twenty to 30 years. The limitations were abolished altogether in 1979, in order to prevent Nazi criminals from avoiding criminal liability.

For most other criminal offences, the statute of limitations is set by Section 78(3) of the Criminal Code as follows:
 30 years for offences which are punishable by a maximum term of imprisonment for life;
 20 years for offences which are punishable by a maximum term of imprisonment of over 10 years but not by imprisonment for life;
 10 years for offences which are punishable by a maximum term of imprisonment of over 5 years but no more than 10 years;
 5 years for offences which are punishable by a maximum term of imprisonment of over 1 year but no more than 5 years;
 3 years for all other offences.

In the civil code, the regular statute of limitations is three years (plus the time until the end of the calendar year); however, different terms between two and thirty years may apply in specific situations. For example, the term is only two years for claims for alleged defects of purchased goods, but 30 years for claims resulting from a court judgement (such as awarded damages).

India
The statute of limitations in India is defined by the Limitations Act, 1963.

The statute of limitations for criminal offences is governed by Sec. 468 of the Criminal Procedure Code.

Ireland

New Zealand 
The statutes of limitations in New Zealand are defined by section 25 of the Criminal Procedure Act 2011. For offences committed by body corporates, the statutes of limitation are determined as if they were a natural person. The limits are as follows:
 6 months for offences which are punishable by a maximum of 3 months imprisonment or a $7,500 fine.
 12 months for offences which are punishable by a maximum of 6 months imprisonment or a $20,000 fine.
 5 years for offences which are punishable by a maximum of 3 years imprisonment, although this can be extended with the consent of the Solicitor-General.
 No limit for offences which are punishable by more than 3 years imprisonment.

Norway
The statute of limitations on murder was abolished by a change in law on 1 July 2014, causing any murders committed after 1 July 1989 to have no statute of limitations. This led to the national police force implementing a new investigation group for old cases called the "Cold Case" group. The law was also changed to let cases involving domestic violence, forced marriage, human trafficking and genital mutilation to count from the day the defendant turns 18 years old. Cases where the statute of limitations has already passed can not be extended due to the constitution preventing it.

Philippines 
In the Philippines, the Revised Penal Code has different limitation periods, based on the penalty of the crime:
 Reclusión perpetua or reclusión temporal (imprisonment of 12 years and 1 day to 40 years): 20 years
 Other afflictive penalties (imprisonment of 6 years and 1 day to 12 years): 15 years
 Correctional penalties: 10 years, except:
 Arresto mayor (imprisonment of 1 month and 1 day to 6 months): 5 years
 Libel and other similar offenses: 1 year
 Oral defamation and slander: 6 months
 Light penalties (imprisonment of 1 day to 30 days): 2 months

Other special laws have their own limitation periods. For crimes punished under the Revised Penal Code, the limitation period won't run if the offender is outside the Philippines, while for those punished under other laws, it does. Municipal ordinances have a limitation period of 2 months.

South Korea
In July 2015, the National Assembly abolished a 25-year limit on first degree murder; it had previously been extended from 15 to 25 years in December 2007.

Turkey 

Turkish Code of Obligations sets the general limitation period to ten years, which applies where the law does not provide a specific limitation period.

There is no statute of limitations for sexual offenses committed against minors, however, under both the Turkish Penal Code (article 99) and Turkish Civil Code (Law No. 2827).

United Kingdom

Unlike many countries, the United Kingdom has no statute of limitations for criminal offences above summary offences (offences tried exclusively in the magistrates’ court). In these cases, criminal proceedings must be brought within six months according to the Magistrates' Courts Act 1980. To obtain a conviction in "some road traffic offences" (i.e., speeding) the driver must be notified, within 14 days of the offence, of the intention to prosecute them according to the Road Traffic Offenders Act 1988.

For civil claims, the statute of limitations varies depending on the type of claim. For example, a claim (debt) from a simple contract can no longer be pursued after six years.

United States
In the United States, statutes of limitations may apply in criminal procedures and civil lawsuits. Statutes of limitations vary significantly among U.S. jurisdictions.

A government agency is permitted by the Congress to create under federal regulations its own statute of limitations.

Retroactive extensions
The U.S. Supreme Court held in Stogner v. California (by a 5–4 majority) that California's retroactive extension of the criminal statute of limitations for sexual offenses committed against minors was an unconstitutional ex post facto law.

Civil statutes
A civil statute of limitations applies to a non-criminal legal action, including a tort or contract case. If the statute of limitations expires before a lawsuit is filed, the defendant may raise the statute of limitations as an affirmative defense to seek dismissal of the charge. The exact time period depends on both the state and the type of claim (contract claim, personal injury, fraud etc.). Most fall in the range of one to ten years, with two to three years being most common.

Criminal statutes
A criminal statute of limitations defines a time period during which charges must be initiated for a criminal offense. If a charge is filed after the statute of limitations expires, the defendant may obtain dismissal of the charge.

Initiation of charges
The statute of limitations in a criminal case only runs until a criminal charge is filed and a warrant issued, even if the defendant is a fugitive. When the identity of a defendant is not known, some jurisdictions provide mechanisms to initiate charges and thus stop the statute of limitations from running. For example, some states allow an indictment of a John Doe defendant based upon a DNA profile derived from evidence obtained through a criminal investigation. Although rare, a grand jury can issue an indictment in absentia for high-profile crimes to get around an upcoming statute of limitations deadline. One example is the skyjacking of Northwest Orient Airlines Flight 305 by D. B. Cooper in 1971. The identity of D. B. Cooper remains unknown to this day, and he was indicted under the name "John Doe, aka Dan Cooper."

Heinous crimes
Crimes which are widely considered heinous have no statute of limitations. Although there is usually no statute of limitations for murder (particularly first-degree murder), judges have been known to dismiss murder charges in cold cases if they feel that the delay violates the defendant's right to a speedy trial. For example, waiting many years for an alibi witness to die before commencing a murder trial would be unconstitutional.

Military law
Under the U.S. Uniform Code of Military Justice (UCMJ), desertion has no statute of limitations.

Maritime Injury Law

Under 46 U.S. Code § 30106, "Except as otherwise provided by law, a civil action for damages for personal injury or death arising out of a maritime tort must be brought within 3 years after the cause of action arose." There are some exceptions to this, primarily with regard to Jones Act cases filed against the government, in which case the statute of limitations can be less than 2 years.

State laws

Exceptions
U.S. jurisdictions recognize exceptions to statutes of limitation that may allow for the prosecution of a crime or civil lawsuit even after the statute of limitations would otherwise have expired. Some states stop the clock for a suspect who is not residing within the state or is purposely hiding. Kentucky, North Carolina, and South Carolina have no statutes of limitation for felonies, while Wyoming includes misdemeanors as well. However, the right to speedy trial may derail any prosecution after many years have passed.

Fraud on the court

When an officer of the court is found to have fraudulently presented facts to impair the court's impartial performance of its legal task, the act (known as fraud upon the court) is not subject to a statute of limitation: "This concept that the inherent power of federal courts to vacate a fraudulently obtained judgment—even years after the judgment was entered—has long been recognized by the Supreme Court." Fraud on the court can be done many ways and in any court. One of which can be "where the court or a member is corrupted or influenced or influence is attempted or where the judge has not performed his judicial function — thus where the impartial functions of the court have been directly corrupted." Officer of the court includes any judge, law clerk, court clerk, lawyer, investigator, probation officer, referee, legal guardian, parenting-time expeditor, mediator, evaluator, administrator, special appointee, and/or anyone else whose influence is part of the judicial mechanism.

Continuing-violations doctrine
In tort law, if any person or entity commits a series of illegal acts against another person or entity (or in criminal law if a defendant commits a continuing crime) the limitation period may begin to run from the last act in the series. The entire chain of events can be tolled if the violations were continuing. Courts have explained that the continuing-violations doctrine "tolls the statute of limitations in situations where a continuing pattern forms due to discriminatory acts which have been occurring over a period of time, as long as at least one incident of discrimination occurred within the limitations period." Whether the continuing-violations doctrine applies to a particular violation is subject to judicial discretion; it was said to apply to copyright infringement in the jurisdiction of the Seventh Circuit, but not in the jurisdiction of the Second Circuit.

See also

 Adverse possession
 Nullum tempus occurrit regi
 Tort reform

References

Civil procedure
Criminal procedure
Statutory law